Sonntag is the German word for Sunday. It may also refer to:

People
Brian Sonntag (born 1951), Washington State Auditor
Brunhilde Sonntag (1936–2002), German composer, musicologist, teacher
Eliška Sonntagová (born 2001), Czech footballer
Ernst Sonntag, West German slalom canoeist
Fredrik Sonntag (born 1987), Swedish ice hockey player
Kurt L. Sonntag (born c. 1964), United States Army general
Maynard Sonntag, Canadian politician from Saskatchewan
Patrick Sonntag (born 1989), German footballer
Robert M. Sonntag, pen name for Martin Schäuble (born 1978), German writer
Roselore Sonntag (born 1934), German artistic gymnast
William Louis Sonntag, Sr. (1822–1900), American landscape painter

Music
"Sonntag" (song), Austrian entry to the 1982 Eurovision song contest
Sonntag aus Licht, opera by Karlheinz Stockhausen

Locations
Sonntag, Austria, municipality in Vorarlberg, Austria
Sonntag Nunatak, glacial island (nunatak) in the Thief Mountains of Antarctica

See also
Sontag

Surnames from nicknames